This is a list of companies either based or with large operations in the greater Harrisburg, Pennsylvania metropolitan area of the United States.  It includes companies based in the Pennsylvania counties of Adams, Cumberland, Dauphin, Lancaster, Lebanon, Perry and York.

For-profit companies
Appalachian Brewing Company (Harrisburg)
Armstrong World Industries (Manor Township, near Lancaster)
The Bon-Ton (Springettsbury Township, near York)
CloudInfoSystems LLC (Lower Paxton Township, Dauphin County, Pennsylvania)
Fulton Financial Corporation (Lancaster)
Gannett Fleming (East Pennsboro Township, near Camp Hill)
Giant Food of Carlisle, Pennsylvania (Middlesex Township, near Carlisle)
Glatfelter (York)
Harsco (Wormleysburg, near Camp Hill)
Herley Industries (West Hempfield Township, near Lancaster)
Hersha Hospitality Trust
The Hershey Company (Hershey, in Derry Township)
Hershey Creamery Company (Lancaster County)
Hershey Entertainment and Resorts Company (Hershey, in Derry Township)
Isaac's Restaurant & Deli (Lancaster)
Karns Quality Foods (Silver Spring Township, near Mechanicsburg)
Martin's Potato Chips (Thomasville, in Jackson Township)
Ollie's Bargain Outlet (Harrisburg)
Penn National Insurance (Harrisburg)
PSECU (Harrisburg)
Rutter's (Manchester Township, near York)
Select Medical Corporation (Lower Allen Township, near Mechanicsburg)
Snyder's of Hanover (Penn Township, near Hanover)
Stauffer's (York)
Tröegs Brewing Company (Harrisburg)
Turkey Hill (Conestoga)
United Concordia (Susquehanna Township, near Harrisburg)
Utz (Hanover)
Weis Markets (Sunbury)

Non-profit companies
Capital Blue Cross (Susquehanna Township, near Harrisburg
Cross Keys Village (Oxford Township, near New Oxford)
Dickinson College (Carlisle)
Holy Spirit Hospital (East Pennsboro Township, near Camp Hill)
Lancaster General Hospital (Lancaster)
Lebanon Valley College (Annville, in Annville Township
Love Harrisburg (Harrisburg)
Penn State Milton S. Hershey Medical Center (Hershey, in Derry Township)
Philhaven(West Cornwall Township, near Mount Gretna)
PinnacleHealth System (Harrisburg)
WellSpan Health (York Township, near York)
 Youth Advocate Programs (Dauphin County)
York College of Pennsylvania (Spring Garden Township, near York)
YTI Career Institute (Springettsbury Township, near York)

Sources used

References

 
Harrisburg Area